Tommy Knarvik (born 1 November 1979) is a Norwegian football coach and a former player who is the manager of Øygarden FK.

As a player he came through the academy at Leeds United and also represented Norway U21s at international level.

Career
He most known for his period in SK Brann. In his early years, Knarvik was a junior player at Leeds United, where he won the FA Youth Cup in 1997. He was awarded the title of "Young Player of the Year" at Leeds, despite competition from such players as Jonathan Woodgate and Harry Kewell. Knarvik only made one appearance for the senior team: as a substitute against Portsmouth in the FA Cup on 23 January 1999.

He had a trial at Hartlepool United in November 2000.

After a few good seasons in Brann, his performance dropped. He was loaned out to Bryne FK but the manager there did not offer a regular contract. Brann then let him go, and Knarvik got a chance in the Adeccoliga club Sogndal. Once again, he did not perform as expected and played only one season in Sogndal. He afterwards played for Sandefjord Fotball.

On 14 November 2007 Tromsø announced that they had signed Knarvik on a four-year contract.

He stayed at Tromsø until 14 March 2011, when he signed for Viking FK.

In 2012 he signed for Bodø/Glimt where he played two more seasons before retiring as a player.

Coaching career
Upon resignation he joined Nest-Sotra as assistant manager.

After four months at Nest-Sotra] he left the club after disagreeing with the board and players on the future of the club. From the start of the 2015 season he was appointed manager of Stord Idrettslag. He left the position in September 2016.

Career statistics

Honours
Norwegian Cup: 2004

References

1979 births
Living people
Footballers from Bergen
Norwegian footballers
Leeds United F.C. players
SK Brann players
Bryne FK players
Sogndal Fotball players
Sandefjord Fotball players
Tromsø IL players
Viking FK players
FK Bodø/Glimt players
Eliteserien players
Norwegian First Division players
Expatriate footballers in England
Norwegian expatriate footballers
Norwegian expatriate sportspeople in England
Association football midfielders
Norwegian football managers